"Four" is a 1954 jazz standard. It was first recorded and arranged in 1954 by jazz trumpeter Miles Davis and released on his album Miles Davis Quartet. It is a 32-bar ABAC form.

The song composition officially credits jazz trumpeter Miles Davis as the writer. However, there is some controversy that it may have actually been composed by someone and purchased by Davis. The American jazz saxophonist Eddie "Cleanhead" Vinson has claimed ownership for the song.

Personnel
Miles Davis – trumpet
Horace Silver – piano
Percy Heath – double bass
Art Blakey – drums

Recordings
The following artists have covered this composition.

Miles Davis – Miles Davis Quartet (1954)
Stan Getz – West Coast Jazz (1955)
 Miles Davis – Workin' with the Miles Davis Quintet (1956)
Gene Ammons – Jammin' in Hi Fi with Gene Ammons (1957)
Anita O'Day – Anita O'Day Sings the Winners (1958)
Phineas Newborn – The Great Jazz Piano of Phineas Newborn Jr. (1962)
Maynard Ferguson - Maynard '62 (1962)  
Sonny Rollins – Sonny Rollins & Co 1964 (1964)
Miles Davis – Four & More (1966)
Joe Henderson – Four (1968)
Red Garland - Red Garland Revisited! (1969)
Dexter Gordon - Bouncin' with Dex (1976)
Harry Sweets Edison – Just Friends: Live at Bubba's Jazz Restaurant (1981)
Chet Baker – Chet Baker in Tokyo (1987)
Sam Jones – Right Down Front: The Riverside Collection (1988)
Mulgrew Miller – From Day to Day (1990)
Madeline Eastman – Mad About Madeline! (1991)
Terry Edwards - Executes Miles Davis Numbers (1992)
Ron Affif – Vierd Blues (1993)
Guy Barker – The Talented Mr Ripley - OST (with Pete King, Iain Dixon, Robin Aspland, Arne Somogyi and Clark Tracey) (1999)
Anita O'Day – Complete Anita O'Day Clef/Verve Sessions (2000)
Keith Jarrett – My Foolish Heart (2007)
Lambert, Hendricks & Ross – Voices in Modern (2011)

Lambert, Hendricks & Ross use Davis's solo on their 1958 album "The Swingers"  which caused some conflict between Hendricks and Davis.

References

1954 songs
1950s jazz standards
Bebop jazz standards
Compositions by Miles Davis
Songs with lyrics by Jon Hendricks